Beich may refer to several subjects

People
Ole Beich, musician from the 1980s.
Albert Beich, screenwriter from the 1940s.
Franz Joachim Beich, classical composer from the 1700s.

Places
Beich Pass, a pass in the Oberaletsch Glacier